Palmer Bar Creek is a creek in the East Kootenay region of British Columbia.  This creek is a tributary of the Moyie River and discovered in the 1860s.  Palmer Bar Creek has been mined for gold.

References

External links
 

Rivers of British Columbia